Sir Ernest Thomas Fisk (8 August 18868 July 1965) was an English Australian businessman and entrepreneur, TV and radio engineer, he was the founder (1913) and later managing director (1916) and chairman (1932) of Amalgamated Wireless (Australasia) (AWA). In 1944 was appointed managing director of the EMI music empire.

Biography

Early life and training
Born the second child of Thomas Harvey Fisk and Charlotte Harritte Holland, he was educated at local Australian schools, although also enrolled at the United Kingdom College, a private London coaching college, he subsequently attended the University of Sydney in 1917, to do a diploma course in the Department of Economics and Commerce.

In June 1906, Fish joined the Marconi Training School, and at Liverpool and Chelmsford, learnt morse and wireless technology, qualifying as a radio operator and engineer

Career

Fisk from selling newspapers, graduated in engineering in the works of Frederick Walton, before becoming one of the first telegraphists at the British Post Office.

from 1909 he worked at American Marconi, demonstrating wireless technology

When first visiting Australia in mid-1910 he demonstrated the Marconi Apparatus for the Orient Steam Navigation Company.

22 September 1918 he proved the possibility of direct radio communication from the UK to Australia by Billy Hughes and Sir Joseph Cook, receiving the first such message at his Sydney home, "Lucania". A memorial was erected on 14 December 1935 to celebrate the achievement.

In August 1919, Sydney received its first demonstration of radio telephony.

Throughout his career he held many key positions in the electronics industry. In the 1950s he predicted that color televisions would be in world-wide use within 30 years, and solar power would be used to cool and heat houses.

Fiskville, Victoria, about 10 kilometres south of Ballan, is named after him. From 1927 to 1969 it was the location of the shortwave wireless transmitting complex operated by AWA as part of the Imperial Wireless Chain.

Honours 
source: Australian Dictionary of Biography

In 1933, he was invested to the Order of the Crown of Italy

Fisk received the King George V Silver Jubilee Medal in 1935

Fisk was knighted on 11 May 1937.

Gallery

References

External links 
 

1886 births
1965 deaths
Australian Knights Bachelor
Radio pioneers
20th-century Australian businesspeople
British emigrants to Australia